Inside Hana's Suitcase is a Canadian documentary film, directed by Larry Weinstein and released in 2009. Adapted in part from Karen Levine's book Hana's Suitcase, the film centres on the story of Hana Brady, a young Czechoslovak Jewish girl who died in the Holocaust, including the reminiscences of George Brady, her sole surviving brother who emigrated to Canada following the war.

The film premiered in February 2009 at the Victoria Film Festival. It was subsequently screened at the 2009 Hot Docs Canadian International Documentary Festival, where it was second runner-up for the Hot Docs Audience Award. It was commercially released in November 2009, and was broadcast by CBC Television in March 2011.

The film received a Genie Award nomination for Best Feature Length Documentary at the 30th Genie Awards in 2010.

References

External links
 

2009 films
2009 documentary films
Canadian documentary films
Jewish Canadian films
2000s English-language films
2000s Canadian films